Personliga val is the second studio album by Peter Jöback, released in 1997 on CD and cassette tape.

Track listing
"Nu eller aldrig" (This Is the Moment)
"Led hans väg" (Bring Him Home)
"Varför Gud?" (Why God, Why?)
"En sång om oss"
"Spindelkvinnans kyss"
"Det måste finnas bättre liv än det" (There's Gonna Be Something Better Than This)
"Ut mot ett hav"
"Jag vill inte ha nåt regn på min parad" (Don't Rain On My Parade)
"Nå't fint som pågår" (Good Thing Going)
"Vem ser ett barn?" (Pity the Child)
"Ett hörn av himlen" (A Piece of Sky / Papa, Can You Hear Me?)

Personnel
Magnus Persson, drums, percussion
Esbjörn Svensson - piano, keyboards, cello, synth-bass
Dan Berglund - bass
Henrik Janson - guitar

Charts

References

1997 albums
Peter Jöback albums
Swedish-language albums